In topology, a branch of mathematics, an abstract stratified space, or a Thom–Mather stratified space is a topological space X that has been decomposed into pieces called strata; these strata are manifolds and are required to fit together in a certain way. Thom–Mather stratified spaces provide a purely topological setting for the study of singularities analogous to the more differential-geometric theory of Whitney.  They were introduced by René Thom, who showed that every Whitney stratified space was also a topologically stratified space, with the same strata. Another proof was given by John Mather in 1970, inspired by Thom's proof.

Basic examples of Thom–Mather stratified spaces include manifolds with boundary (top dimension and codimension 1 boundary) and manifolds with corners (top dimension, codimension 1 boundary, codimension 2 corners), real or complex analytic varieties, or orbit spaces of smooth transformation groups.

Definition

A Thom–Mather stratified space is a triple  where  is a topological space (often we require that it is locally compact, Hausdorff, and second countable),  is a decomposition of  into strata,

These data need to satisfy the following conditions. 

 Each stratum  is a locally closed subset and the decomposition  is locally finite.
 Each stratum  is a smooth manifold.
 . So  can be viewed as the distance function from the stratum .
 For each pair of strata , the restriction  is a submersion.

Examples 
One of the original motivations for stratified spaces were decomposing singular spaces into smooth chunks. For example, given a singular variety , there is a naturally defined subvariety, which is the singular locus. This may not be a smooth variety, so taking the iterated singularity locus  will eventually give a natural stratification. A simple algebreo-geometric example is the singular hypersurface

where  is the prime spectrum.

See also
 Singularity theory
 Whitney conditions
 Stratifold
 Intersection homology
 Thom's first isotopy lemma
 stratified space

References
 Goresky, Mark; MacPherson, Robert Stratified Morse theory, Springer-Verlag, Berlin, 1988.
 Goresky, Mark; MacPherson, Robert Intersection homology II, Invent. Math. 72 (1983), no. 1, 77--129.
 Mather, J. Notes on topological stability, Harvard University, 1970.
 Thom, R. Ensembles et morphismes stratifiés, Bulletin of the American Mathematical Society 75 (1969), pp.240-284.
 

Generalized manifolds
Singularity theory
Stratifications